Vaccinium glaucoalbum, the grey-white blueberry, is a species of Vaccinium native to Nepal, east Himalaya, and Myanmar, and Tibet and Yunnan in China. An evergreen shrub with white-bloomed black berries, it has gained the Royal Horticultural Society's Award of Garden Merit as an ornamental. It grows in thickets and forest margins. Local people collect and eat the fruit.

Taxonomy
Vaccinium glaucoalbum was first described for science by Charles Baron Clarke in the third volume of Hooker's Flora of British India, published in 1882. Clarke attributed the name to Hooker. In the same work, Clarke also described Vaccinium sikkimense. Some sources agree this is a separate species, while others treat it as a synonym of V. glaucoalbum.

References

glaucoalbum
Plants described in 1882